= Jaya Sivaswami Tyagi =

Dr. Jaya S. Tyagi is the Head, Department of Biotechnology, All India Institute of Medical Sciences, New Delhi. She holds a specialization in Molecular Biology, Mycobacteriology and Gene Regulation. For her outstanding achievements throughout her career, she has received the prestigious Stree Shakti Award (2013) -The Parallel Force, said that this award is constituted for the women, by the women and of the women since 1988.

== Education ==
Dr Jaya's research papers are widely published and she has several prestigious award to her credit. On the occasion of receiving an award she said that women usually work for the sake of work, awards are bonus in the process. Dr. Tyagi completed her graduation, post-graduation and Ph.D. from University of Delhi. And further her Post doctoral training at Laboratory of Molecular Biology, National Cancer Institute, NIH, USA (1979-1983).

== Research ==
Her research interests include molecular pathogenesis with reference to dormancy adaptation of Mycobacterium tuberculosis, TB Inhibitor discovery and development, deciphering host-M. tb interactions, developing a tool box for the diagnosis of tuberculosis. Dr. Tyagi also holds the membership of professional bodies such as Society of Biological Chemists (India), Microbiological Society of India, Indian Society for Cell Biology, American Society of Microbiology. She has 27 years of experience in teaching of Bacterial Genetics, Molecular Biology and Recombinant DNA technology including both theory and training courses. Dr. Tyagi has also holds the membership of Guha Research Conference. She is a fellow of National Academy of Sciences, Indian Academy of Sciences, Indian National Science Academy and also a J.C. Bose National Fellow. She has been awarded several other awards such as National Science Talent Scholarship, University Gold Medal, Dr. Kona Sampath Kumar Memorial Prize, P.S. Sarma Memorial Award (SBCI), National Women Bioscientist Award, New Millennium Science Medal (Indian Science Congress), Tata Innovation Fellowship (DBT, Govt. of India).
